Full Circle is the third studio album by American rock band Drowning Pool, released on August 7, 2007, by Eleven Seven. It is their first of two studio releases with Ryan McCombs, then former singer of SOiL, who joined the band after the departure of Jason 'Gong' Jones in 2005. The first single off the album, "Soldiers", is dedicated to the United States Army.

The album debuted at number 64 on the United States Billboard 200, selling about 10,000 copies in its first week. As of September 12, 2007, the album has sold around 29,000 copies in the United States.

Four singles were released to promote the album. The final single "Shame" was released June 29, 2009 almost two years after the album's release. The album was moderately commercially successful, and received great amounts of positiveity by fans. Drowning Pool embarked on several tours to promote Full Circle.

Writing and recording
Full Circle is the only studio album by Drowning Pool with more than 11 tracks; it has 13. McCombs said that "Shame" was one of his favorite songs from the album. The entire band contributed to the album's writing process, as well as including an outside writer, Nikki Sixx who wrote a song for the band, entitled "Reason I'm Alive", which made it on the album. The album also includes a cover of Billy Idol's song "Rebel Yell".

The album was self funded. Ryan McCombs explained:

Track listing

Personnel
Drowning Pool
 Ryan McCombs – vocals
 Stevie Benton – bass
 C. J. Pierce – guitar
 Mike Luce – drums

Production
 Produced by Ben Schigel except "Reason I'm Alive" (by Nikki Sixx and DJ Ashba)
 Recorded by Ben Schigel at January Sound Studio, Dallas, Texas
 Mixed by Mike Plotnikoff except "Reason I'm Alive"
Engineered by Mikal Blue
 Artwork by P.R. Brown
 Live photos by Michelle Overson
 Executive producer: Allan Kovac

Charts

References

2007 albums
Drowning Pool albums
Eleven Seven Label Group albums